The Soanian culture is a prehistoric technological culture from the Siwalik Hills in the Indian subcontinent. It is named after the Soan Valley in Pakistan. Soanian sites are found along the Siwalik region in present-day India, Nepal and Pakistan. The Soanian culture has been approximated to have taken place during the Middle Pleistocene period or the mid-Holocene epoch (Northgrippian). Debates still goes on today regarding the exact period occupied by the culture due to artefacts often being found in non-datable surface context. This culture was first discovered and named by the anthropology and archaeology team led by Helmut De Terra and Thomas Thomson Paterson. Soanian artifacts were manufactured on quartzite pebbles, cobbles, and occasionally on boulders, all derived from various fluvial sources
on the Siwalik landscape. Soanian assemblages generally comprise varieties of choppers, discoids, scrapers, cores, and numerous flake type tools, all occurring in varying typo-technological frequencies at different sites.

Excluding some localities in the Soan Valley of Pakistan, the site complex of Guler (Beas Valley) and Toka in India, and the Arjun-3 site in Nepal, Soanian and similar assemblages rarely comprise more than a few dozen artifacts.
The emergence of Soanian tools has been tied to the local development of boulder conglomerate formation through prehistoric tectonic processes that created convenient transporting system for raw materials.

Recent researches have been focusing on the technological culture’s connection with the Harappan culture that originated near the Indus River.

Dating and historical significance 
The prehistoric dating of Soanian culture is one that has been debated by scholars due to artefacts being often found in undatable surface contexts. Some argue it is a culture developed by ancient extinct hominids; homo erectus.  Others have suggested it is the creation of a group of deurbanized population derived from the Harappan civilization near the Indus alluvial plain. Its artefacts are often found near those of Acheulian culture, which is a homo erectus culture that took place around the same sub-Himalayan culture zone. There is currently no evidence of the two cultures ever crossing path and is believed to have existed in different timeframe. There are currently two main interpretations towards the prehistoric timeframe occupied by the Soanian culture. One sees the Soanian culture as a period that took place in three connecting intervals throughout Middle Pleistocene period (774,000 to 129,000 years ago). The other sees the Soanian culture as a period of single distinct technological culture that may have existed earliest from the mid-Holocene epoch with some artefacts potentially belonging to the Harappan culture.

Three-interval period theory 
According to this view, Soanian technological culture evolved throughout three broad intervals during the Middle Pleistocene period from circa 774,000 to 129,000 years ago. Scholars of this view believe the technological culture potentially belonged to the ancient hominid group: homo erectus. The three intervals are known as Pre-Soan, Early Soan, and Late-Soan. The exact dating of these periods is unknown due to tools often being found in undateable surface contexts. This view is developed out of Helmut de Terra and Thomas Thomson Paterson’s early work in the Siwalik region. Paterson, in analysing the terrace sequence along the Soan valley in Pakistan, believed that several Soanian technological phases existed within the glacial and interglacial period. Pre-Soan and Early Soanian tools are considered as mostly heavy-duty tools like choppers and core scrapers derived from Lower paleolithic technological culture of the region. These tools contrast with Late-Soan tools which consist of flake tools that are smaller in sizes and for finer purposes.

Single distinct technological culture 
Scholars of this view suggest Soanian technology did not evolve in three intervals, but rather all belong to one distinct period in early homo sapien history during the mid-Holocene epoch. Scholars began to question the three-interval theory when both early Soanian tools and Late-Soanians tools started to be found together along the same undatable sites. To continue, the Soan river ‘terraces’ observed by de Terra and Paterson were later discovered to be erosional features rather than terrace sequences that would suggest the prehistorical timing of the artefacts. Second, new findings by the father and son duo Anujot Singh Soni and Vidwan Singh Soni have found Soanian tools on datable sites near Northwestern sub-Himalaya. These sites were dated to be from mid to late mid-Holocene. On some of the sites, potsherds and weathered red ware with coarse fabric were also discovered. These artefacts are believed to have belonged to the Harappan civilization that later lived in villages on the sub-Himalayas. These are early human civilizations that emerged from antecedent agricultural communities of hills bouldering the Indus alluvial plain.

Anthropological relation to homo sapiens 
Anatomically modern humans (i.e. Homo sapiens) are believed to emerge from Africa within the Soanian time period around 300,000 years ago, its been argued that their ways of life changed relatively little from that of archaic humans of the Middle Paleolithic. It would remain this way until about 50,000 years ago, when discoveries of a marked increase in the diversity of artefacts found were associated with modern human remains.

Geographical context 

The Soanian culture is in the Western part of the Sub-Himalayan terrain, stretching between river Indus and Yamuna. This area is the major producer of Soanian artefacts. The occurrence of this technological culture has been correlated to the prehistoric geographical changes in the region that allowed prehistoric humans easy access to raw materials.

This view is often hypothesized to have been the result of boulder conglomerate formation in the Siwalik region between 0.7 to 1.7 million years ago. These formations are collections of large rocks made of small fragments that have been deposed through tectonic processes, they can look like levitated ranges or hills. The tectonic process also formed rivers and fluvial systems that carried and collected raw materials, such as distal alluvial fans and proximal distal braided stream systems. In the Siwalik region, the dominant raw materials available are quartzite pebbles, cobbles, and boulders.

From 1.6 million years ago onwards, the existing boulder conglomerate formation saw more changes that further contributed to easy access of raw materials for local ancient humans. Further tectonic movements and erosion saw the Siwalik fluvial courses altered –developing more complex river systems, and deposits that carried and collected sediments. This also contributed to new drainage systems formed by new alluvial conditions in the South Siwalik region. These new developments allowed for the easy access of materials and prevents the need for long-distance transport. This geographical context the Soanian culture developed from is known to scholars as the Post-Boulder Conglomerate Formation period.

Scholars of the single interval period argue Soanian tools are developed due to the movement of the Harappan culture. During the mid-Holocene global arid phase, when water supply starts to dry up across the globe, the Harappans who were originally around the Indus valley mostly shifted to the sub-Himalayas in search of water sources. This led to the diminishing of the broad trading system of resources within the civilization that included materials like metal. As a result, Harappans started to manufacture tools using stones that are later discovered to be Soanian tools. This period has been viewed as a process of deurbanization of the Harappan culture, where they began to decrease in size, turning into smaller village-type settlements.

On a broader geographical context, Soanian culture is one of many different lithic cultures in Southeast Asia that are also abundantly available in Sub-Himalayas. Many unifacial flake tools belonging to the Hoabinhians are discovered near Soanian sites. These tools are also found throughout Nepal, South China, Taiwan and Australia. Another prominent lithic culture in the region belongs to the Acheulians, which are distinguished by the preference for bifacial tools.

Post-Siwalik fluvial deposits 
Most of the post-Siwalik fluvial deposits today are mostly disintegrated, they currently lie above older decomposed sedimentary deposits. Some of them are covered in thick vegetation. These sites stand in contrast with remaining deposits that still stand today, forming basin like structures.

Technologies 

Understandings for the technological development of Soanian tools have been limited due to most sites rarely comprising more than a few dozen artefacts. The technologies of Soanian culture are stone based and are often described as non-bifacial assemblages. These tools are categorized based on their unifacial nature with a singular flat surface. Soanian assemblages generally comprise varieties of choppers, discoids, scrapers, cores, and numerous flake type tools. These tools are mainly for heavy duty, but also have finer purposes as seen in some flake tools used for cutting. These tools are often manufactured on quartzite pebbles, cobbles, and occasionally from boulders. With Soanian technologies being limited, tools often remain similar in shape and sizes to their sourced materials. Soanian technological culture differ largely from other pre-historic culture in the region. Other cultures found in Siwalik like the Ancheulian are often described to be of bi-facial nature and focused on hand axes. The comparison between other culture of the same region has seen Soanian technology categorized as a continuation of archaic technology rather than Neolithic. This is due to Soanian culture often being isolated within the mountainous region away from plain populations who have access to more materials.

Perspective of the singlular interval scholars 
Scholars of the singular interval period view the development of Soanian technology as a result of the deurbanization of the Harappan culture. This group was originally thought to have had large trading networks with intricate tools, as well as their own scripting system. However, due to the change of climate during the mid-Holocene epoch, many original settlements collapsed in search of water and have been reduced in size. The group began adopting tools that were more easily accessible.

Excavation history and current studies 
The Western Sub-Himalaya and the Siwalik Hills first caught the interest of archaeologists and palaeontologists in the early 1800s when fossil apes of the Miocene age were uncovered. This led to interests from Western scholars to explore the region for potential pre-historic cultural artefacts. The first official discovery of lithic artifacts in the Western Sub-Himalaya zone was reported in 1880 by Theobald W, in a report titled: “On the discovery of a celt of Palaeolithic type in the Punjab”. Discoveries in the Siwalik Hills for paleolithic lithic occurrences were first noted by Wadia and K.R.U Todd. Their research influenced the academic duo of Helmut De Terra and Thomas Thomson Paterson to conduct their own research in the region. De Terra and Paterson deemed the artefacts found in Siwalik belonged to a specific technological culture that they named “Soanian”. They did not conduct any excavation but only focused on selectively collected surface materials from surrounding terraces. This work confirmed lithic occurrence specific to the region and prompted further research. Excavations later followed suit outside of India, taking place in Pakistan and Nepal that further confirms the existence of pre-historic culture in the Siwalik zone.

Modern research 
Recent research predominantly takes place in India led by Indian scholars with a broader scope. As of 2006, the study area encompassed the Siwalik frontal slopes and some interior zones between the Ghaggar River to the west and Markanda River to the east. The area is approximately 60 km long and covers an area of approximately 100 km square. Research area in Pakistan along the Soan river has faced damages due to sewage disposal and municipal waste onto rivers.

Methods for modern day excavation have also changed from the time of De Terra. During his time, scholars focused more on assessing the scattering patterns of tools in smaller sampled regions. Modern observations due to technological developments are focused on the occurrence of Soanian tools as a complex behavioural system. This method entails the careful surveying and recording of artefacts along vast regions, seeking to understand the spatial relationship each lithic culture has with one another. This form of observation has allowed scholars to observe the relations of the emergence of certain tools to certain geographical contexts.

At Chauntra in Himachal Pradesh, hand axes and cleavers were found. Tools up to two million years old have been recovered. In the Soan River Gorge, many fossil bearing rocks are exposed on the surface. 14 million year old fossils of gazelle, rhinoceros, crocodile, giraffe and rodents have been found there. Some of these fossils are on display at the Pakistan Museum of Natural History in Islamabad.

See also

 South Asian Stone Age
 Madrasian culture

References

Further reading

External links
The Acheulian/Soanian dichotomy

Archaeological cultures in India
Paleolithic
Archaeology in Pakistan
Archaeology of India
Archaeology of Nepal